Gone Batty is a 1954 Warner Bros. Looney Tunes animated cartoon short directed by Bob McKimson.

Plot
The film's main character is Bobo the Elephant, making his first appearance since Hobo Bobo, which was also directed by McKimson. Bobo is a baseball team mascot for the lean and meek Sweetwater Shnooks, all of whom are rendered unconscious by their opponents, the husky and brutal Greenville Goons.  Just as a victory by the Goons seems nearly inevitable, Bobo singlehandedly rallies his team back for a win in the bottom of the ninth inning.

Overview
Robert McKimson directed the animated cartoon from a story (lifted in part from the Friz Freleng/Michael Maltese 1946 opus Baseball Bugs) by Sid Marcus and animator Ben Washam. Animation was done from Robert Givens' layout by Charles McKimson, Herman Cohen, Rod Scribner and Phil DeLara with backgrounds by Richard H. Thomas and music by Carl Stalling. Voices were provided by Mel Blanc and an uncredited Robert C. Bruce as a play-by-play announcer.

References

External links 
 

1954 films
1954 animated films
1954 short films
1950s Warner Bros. animated short films
1950s sports films
American baseball films
Baseball animation
Animated films about elephants
Films directed by Robert McKimson
Looney Tunes shorts
Films scored by Carl Stalling
1950s English-language films